The police prefecture is the unit of the French Ministry of the Interior that provides police, emergency services, and various administrative services to the population of the city of Paris and the surrounding three suburban  of Hauts-de-Seine, Seine-Saint-Denis, and Val-de-Marne. It is headed by the Prefect of Police.

"", as it is also known, supervises the Paris Police force, the Paris Fire Brigade, and various administrative departments in charge of issuing ID cards and driver licenses or monitoring alien residents. Since 2017, it has acquired direct responsibility for the three main airports of the Paris area (Charles de Gaulle, Orly and Le Bourget).

In contrast with the Préfecture, the municipal police report to the city government, rather than to the national government. Municipal police officers began patrolling city streets on foot, bicycle, and by car starting on October 18, 2021. The goal of the municipal police is to "make neighbourhoods safer and more peaceful and ensure that public space is shared," for example by enforcing laws on parking, littering, breaking up quarrels, and assisting homeless or elderly residents.

The  is a large building located in the Place Louis Lépine on the Île de la Cité. This building was built as a barracks for the Garde républicaine from 1863 to 1867 (architect Pierre-Victor Calliat) and was occupied by the Prefecture in 1871.

As it is the capital of France, with government assemblies and offices and foreign embassies, Paris poses special issues of security and public order. Consequently, the national government has been responsible for providing law enforcement and emergency services since the creation of the Lieutenancy General of Police by Louis XIV on March 15, 1667. Disbanded at the start of the French Revolution in 1789, it was replaced by the current Prefecture of Police created by Napoléon I on February 17, 1800. This means that, up until 2021, Paris did not have its own  and that the Police Nationale provided all of these services directly as a subdivision of France's Ministry of the Interior.

Policemen assigned to "" are part of the Police nationale but the Police Prefect reports directly to the Interior Minister, not to the director of the Police nationale ( or DGPN). In Parisian slang, the police were sometimes known as "the archers", a very old slang term in reference to the archers of the long-defunct Royal Watch.

Paris also has the "Direction de la Prévention, de la Sécurité et de la Protection" (DPSP) (Prevention, Security and Protection Directorate) which is composed of Agents with municipal police powers titled inspecteurs de sécurité (Security Inspectors). The DPSP reports to the Mayor of Paris.

Jurisdiction 

The jurisdiction of the Prefecture of Police was initially the Seine . These four communes were added in the 19th century to the jurisdiction of the Prefecture of Police in order to ensure special protection of the imperial/royal residences located there.

The Seine  was disbanded in 1968 and the jurisdiction of the Prefecture of Police is now the city of Paris (which is both a commune and a ) and the three surrounding  of Hauts-de-Seine, Seine-Saint-Denis, Val-de-Marne. This territory made up of four  is larger than the pre-1968 Seine .

The Prefecture of Police also has limited jurisdiction over the whole Île-de-France  for the coordination of law enforcement, including combatting cybercrime. The Prefect of Police, acting as Prefect of the Defense Zone of Paris, is in charge of planning non-military defense measures to keep public order, guarantee the security of public services, and organize rescue operations (in case of natural disaster) for the whole Île-de-France  (which is made up of eight , the four inner ones being the regular jurisdiction of the Prefecture of Police, and the four outer ones being outside of its regular jurisdiction). As such, he coordinates the work of the departmental  of Île-de-France.

Nomination and missions 
Headed by a prefect titled The "Prefect of Police", who (as are all prefects) is named by the President in the Council of Ministers, and operates under the Minister of the Interior, commands the Prefecture which is responsible for the following:

 security of Paris, if necessary in collaboration with the military;
 issuing identification cards, driver's licenses, passports, residential and work permits for foreigners;
 motor vehicle registration and traffic control;
 registration of associations, and their creation, status modification and dissolution;
 protection of the environment, general salubrity;
 determining the dates of discount sales in large stores which can be held only twice a year;
 issuing permits to bakeries/boulangeries for their summer vacation to assure that all the bakeries in a given neighborhood are not closed at the same time;
 management of police and firefighters.

The Prefect of Police can issue  (local writs) defining rules pertaining to his field of competency. For instance, the rules of operation and security of Paris public parks are issued as joint arrêtés from the Mayor of Paris and the Prefect of Police.

There is also a prefect of Paris, prefect for the Île-de-France region, whose services handle some tasks not devoted to the Police Prefect, such as certain classes of building permits.

Address 
Place Louis Lépine, 1 rue de Lutèce, 75004 Paris (métro Cité)
Tel: 01 54 73 53 73, 01 53 71 53 71, 01 40 79 79 79.
Emergency telephone number: 1-1-2
Emergency medical service SAMU/SMUR (Hospital Based) 1-5
Police 1-7
Fire Brigade (Operates emergency ambulances as EMS) 1-8

Organization 

The Prefecture of Police is divided into three sub-prefectures headed by prefects due to their importance.

Because the Police Prefecture provides some services that are normally provided by city governments, its funding partially comes from the City of Paris and other city governments within its jurisdiction.

In addition to forces from the National Police, the Police Prefecture has traffic wardens or crossing guards who enforce parking rules; it has recently added some wardens that direct traffic at crossroads and other similar duties, known as circulation, with specific uniforms.

Prefect and Director of the Cabinet 
Consists of the Cabinet (staff) itself, the Gendarmerie Nationale Liaison Office, and 6 Local Directorates:
Public Security – uniformed police officers
Lost and Found Property
Central Accident Service
Public Order and Traffic Control – uniformed police who protect public buildings, provide crowd and traffic control services
Judicial Police – detectives and investigators (the )
General Information – records
Inspectorate – internal affairs
Paris Fire Brigade – the military unit which provides all fire and emergency ambulance services (other emergency medical services are provided by SAMU/SMUR)
and other agencies:
Classified Facility Inspectorate
Psychiatric Infirmary
Toxicology Laboratory
Central Laboratory-explosives, pollution, chemical analysis, electrical and fire safety, etc.

Prefect and Secretary-General for the Administration of the Police 
with four Administrative Directorates:
General Police – Administrative police duties
Medico-Legal Institute
Traffic, Transport, and Trade
Population Protection – public health matters
Veterinary Service
Human Resources – personnel, budget, equipment and police labor disputes

Prefect and Secretary-General for the Zone of Defence 
with two agencies:
Defence Zone staff
Interdepartmental Service for Civil Defence

Resources 

Budget:
One billion Euros by National government
488 million Euros by Paris and surrounding departments of the 
Personnel:
45,860 employees, of which 30,200 police officers
8,300 Military Personnel of the Paris Fire Brigade
494 Facilities, stations, and offices
6,120 vehicles – including police cars, fire trucks, motorcycles, boats, and helicopters

Activities 
350,000 incidents of crime reports
two million administrative documents issues
200,000 drivers licenses issued

List of lieutenant generals and prefects of police 
The office vanished at the start of the French Revolution and police was vested in the hands of the Paris Commune. Reorganized by Napoléon Bonaparte in 1800, the Paris Police has been headed by the  since that time.

Lieutenant generals of police 
Gabriel Nicolas de la Reynie: March 29, 1667 – January 29, 1697
Marc René de Voyer de Paulmy, marquis d'Argenson: January 29, 1697 – January 28, 1718
Louis Charles de Machault d'Arnouville (father of French statesman Jean-Baptiste de Machault d'Arnouville): January 28, 1718 – January 26, 1720
Marc Pierre de Voyer de Paulmy, comte d'Argenson (son of Marc René): January 26 – July 1, 1720
Gabriel Taschereau de Baudry: July 1, 1720 – April 26, 1722
Marc Pierre de Voyer de Paulmy, comte d'Argenson: April 26, 1722 – January 28, 1724
Nicolas Ravot d'Ombreval: January 28, 1724 – August 28, 1725
René Hérault (grandfather of French Revolution politician Hérault de Séchelles): August 28, 1725 – December 21, 1739
Claude-Henri Feydeau de Marville: December 21, 1739 – May 27, 1747
Nicolas René Berryer: May 27, 1747 – October 29, 1757
Henri Léonard Jean-Baptiste Bertin: October 29, 1757 – November 21, 1759
Antoine de Sartine: November 21, 1759 – August 24, 1774
Jean Charles Pierre Lenoir: August 24, 1774 – May 14, 1775
Joseph d'Albert: May 14, 1775 – June 19, 1776
Jean Charles Pierre Lenoir: June 19, 1776 – July 31, 1785
Louis Thiroux de Crosne: July 31, 1785 – July 16, 1789

Source: Centre historique des Archives nationales, Série Y, Châtelet de Paris, on page 38 of the PDF.

Prefects of police 
Louis-Nicolas Dubois: March 8, 1800 – October 14, 1810
Étienne-Denis Pasquier: October 14, 1810 – May 13, 1814
Jacques Claude Beugnot: May 13 – December 27, 1814
Antoine Balthazar Joachim d'André: December 27, 1814 – March 14, 1815
Louis Antoine Fauvelet de Bourrienne: March 14  – March 20, 1815
Pierre-François Réal: March 20 – July 3, 1815
Eustache Marie Pierre Marc-Antoine Courtin: July 3 – July 9, 1815
Élie Decazes: July 9 – September 29, 1815
Jules Anglès: September 29, 1815 – December 20, 1821
Guy Delavau: December 20, 1821 – January 6, 1828
Louis-Marie Debelleyme: January 6, 1828 – August 13, 1829
Claude Mangin: August 13, 1829 – July 30, 1830
Nicolas Bavoux: July 30 – August 1, 1830
Louis Gaspard Amédée Girod de l'Ain: August 1 – November 7, 1830
Achille Libéral Treilhard: November 7 – December 26, 1830
Jean Jacques Baude: December 26, 1830 – February 21, 1831
Alexandre François Vivien: February 21 – September 17, 1831
Sébastien Louis Saulnier: September 17 – October 15, 1831
Henri Gisquet: October 15, 1831 – September 10, 1836
Gabriel Delessert: September 10, 1836 – February 24, 1848
Marc Caussidière: February 24 – May 18, 1848
Ariste Jacques Trouvé-Chauvel: May 18 – July 19, 1848
François-Joseph Ducoux: July 19 – October 14, 1848
Guillaume François Gervais: October 14 – December 20, 1848
Chéri Rebillot: December 20, 1848 – November 8, 1849
Pierre Carlier: November 8, 1849 – October 27, 1851
Charlemagne de Maupas: October 27, 1851 – January 22, 1852
Sylvain Blot (acting): January 23 – January 27, 1852
Pierre-Marie Piétri: January 27, 1852 – March 16, 1858
Symphorien Boittelle: March 16, 1858 – February 21, 1866
 (younger brother of Pierre-Marie Piétri): February 21, 1866 – September 4, 1870
Émile de Kératry: September 4 – October 10, 1870
Edmond Adam (husband of French writer Juliette Adam): October 11 – November 2, 1870
Ernest Cresson: November 2, 1870 – February 11, 1871
Albert Choppin (acting): February 11 – March 16, 1871
Louis Ernest Valentin: March 16 – November 17, 1871
Léon Renault: November 17, 1871 – February 9, 1876
Félix Voisin: February 9, 1876 – December 17, 1877
Albert Gigot: December 17, 1877 – March 3, 1879
Louis Andrieux (natural father of famous French poet Louis Aragon): March 4, 1879 – July 16, 1881
Jean Louis Ernest Camescasse: July 16, 1881 – April 23, 1885
Félix-Alexandre Gragnon: April 23, 1885 – November 17, 1887
Léon Bourgeois: November 17, 1887 – March 10, 1888
Henri Lozé: March 10, 1888 – July 11, 1893
Louis Lépine: July 11, 1893 – October 14, 1897
Charles Blanc: October 14, 1897 – June 23, 1899
Louis Lépine: June 23, 1899 – March 29, 1913
Célestin Hennion: March 30, 1913 – September 2, 1914
Émile Marie Laurent: September 3, 1914 – June 3, 1917
Louis Hudelo: June 3 – November 23, 1917
Fernand Raux: November 23, 1917 – May 13, 1921
Robert Leullier: May 14, 1921 – July 5, 1922
Armand Naudin: July 5, 1922 – August 25, 1924
Alfred Morain: August 25, 1924 – April 14, 1927
Jean Chiappe: April 14, 1927 – February 3, 1934
Adrien Bonnefoy-Sibour: February 3 – March 20, 1934
Roger Langeron: March 20, 1934 – February 13, 1941
Camille Marchand (acting): February 13 – May 14, 1941
François Bard: May 14, 1941 – May 21, 1942
Amédée Bussière: May 21, 1942 – August 19, 1944
Charles Luizet: August 19, 1944 – March 20, 1947
Armand Ziwès (acting): March 20 – May 27, 1947
Roger Léonard: May 27, 1947 – May 2, 1951
Jean Baylot: May 2, 1951 – July 13, 1954
André Dubois: July 13, 1954 – November 21, 1955
Roger Genebrier: November 21, 1955 – December 16, 1957
André Lahillonne: December 16, 1957 – March 14, 1958
Maurice Papon: March 15, 1958 – January 18, 1967
Maurice Grimaud: January 18, 1967 – April 13, 1971
Jacques Lenoir: April 13, 1971 – July 1, 1973
Jean Paolini: July 1, 1973 – May 3, 1976
Pierre Somveille: May 3, 1976 – August 8, 1981
Jean Périer: August 8, 1981 – June 9, 1983
Guy Fougier: June 9, 1983 – July 17, 1986
 Jean Paolini: July 17, 1986 – August 16, 1988
Pierre Verbrugghe: August 16, 1988 – April 30, 1993
Philippe Massoni: April 30, 1993 – April 9, 2001
Jean-Paul Proust: April 9, 2001 – December 6, 2004
Pierre Mutz: December 6, 2004 – June 11, 2007
 Michel Gaudin: June 11, 2007 – May 2012
Bernard Boucault: May 2012 – July 2015
Michel Cadot: July 2015 – April 2017
Michel Delpuech: April 2017 – March 2019
Didier Lallement: March 2019 – July 2022
Laurent Nuñez: since July 2022

Sources: La Grande Encyclopédie, volume 27, page 95, published in 1900. See scan of the full text at Gallica: . / List of Prefects of Paris on rulers.org: . / Archives of Le Monde: .

See also 
 Law enforcement in France
 Minister of the Interior (France)
 National Police (France)
 Department of Public Safety

References

External links 

 Official Website 
 Official Website 

National law enforcement agencies of France
Government of Paris
National Police (France)
4th arrondissement of Paris
 
Île de la Cité